William McGill (29 December 1814 – 9 November 1883) was a politician in Ontario, Canada. He represented Ontario South in the Legislative Assembly of Ontario as a Liberal member from 1867 to 1871.

McGillwas born in Glasgow, Scotland to a jeweller and watchmaker, and came to Whitby Township, Upper Canada with his parents while still young. McGill studied medicine at Willoughby Medical College in Ohio, received an MD from McGill College in 1848 and studied at Mott's medical school in New York City. He set up practice in Oshawa. In 1848, he married Julia Ann Bates. He was elected to the medical council of the college of physicians and surgeons of Ontario in 1866. In 1871, he was defeated by Abram Farewell in his bid for reelection to the legislative assembly. McGill served on the county council from 1874 to 1876. He became an elder of the Disciples Church.

References
 
 
 
 

1814 births
1883 deaths
19th-century Canadian politicians
19th-century Scottish medical doctors
19th-century Scottish people
Canadian Disciples of Christ
Christian Church (Disciples of Christ) clergy
Immigrants to Upper Canada
Ontario Liberal Party MPPs
Politicians from Glasgow
Scottish emigrants to pre-Confederation Ontario